The Lulu International Convention Centre is located at Puzhakkal, in Thrissur city of Kerala state. The property is owned and managed by Yusuff Ali M.A. Chairman and managing director of Lulu Group International, which has extensive business in retail, hospitality, real estate etc. The 5,000-seat convention centre was built by EMKE Group of Industries. Some of the interior architecture was by Evolution Interior Architecture. The convention center has 5 venues for conferences, which can accommodate from 450 to 2,200 people. A 5-star Hotel (the Garden Hotel) is also present on the site. It features an amazing parking for 1800 cars and also has an exclusive Helipad.

References

External links

Companies based in Thrissur
Convention centres in India
Buildings and structures in Thrissur
2006 establishments in Kerala
Buildings and structures completed in 2006